The Chemins de fer électriques Veveysans (CEV) was a railway company that built and operated narrow gauge electric railway lines from Vevey to Blonay, Chamby, Châtel-St-Denis and Les Pléiades, in Switzerland. It began operations in 1902. The CEV and three other companies merged to become the Transports Montreux–Vevey–Riviera in 2001. The Vevey–Les Pléiades railway line remains in active use.

History 
The first section to see service, that from Vevey to Chamby, was opened on 1 October 1902. Next section was the branch line from St-Légier to Châtel–St-Denis that opened on 2 April 1904. On 8 July 1911 the rack line from Blonay to Les Pléiades was opened.

On 23 November 1911, Blonay was also reached by the Clarens - Chailly - Blonay electric tramway operated by a separate company (CCB). This closed at the end of 1955, being replaced by buses.

Presently it operates on 900 V DC, overhead contact. Train services were offered from Vevey to Chamby and Châtel-St-Denis, where the CEV connected to the MOB and GFM (now tpf). The electric motor coach from Vevey to Chamby conveyed coaches to Blonay, where they were taken over by a rack locomotive and brought up to Les Pléiades.

On 22 May 1966, the section Blonay–Chamby was closed, followed by St-Légier–Châtel-St-Denis on 31 May 1969. While the Châtel-St-Denis branch was torn up, track to Chamby remained. Railway enthusiasts formed an association which could set up a weekend museum operation starting on 20 July 1968. On 24 May 1998 CEV reintroduced regular trains but stopped these services again two years later because of low patronage. The infrastructure was always owned by CEV and the museum trains of the Blonay-Chamby museum railway operate in open access.

In that , the line rises some  reaching  at Les Pléiades.

The line has its own workshops at Vevey although much work is undertaken at the MOB's Chernex works and also a small depot at Blonay.

In 2001, CEV was merged into the Transports Montreux-Vevey-Riviera (MVR) which is managed and operated by the MOB management under their Golden Pass Services banner.

Rolling stock 
 

               
  
Note 1: This class are labeled Chemin de fer Léger de la Riviera, Two of them are usually to be found working on the Vevey - Blonay line whilst the other two are found working from Montreux. The numbering scheme used is that of MOB.
Note 2: Rotary plough blowers by Boschung Schmitten on downhill end, double plough blades in 'V' formation at uphill end, mounted on underframe of L 401.
Note 3: This railcar was the first to be released from works with the new "golden pass" logo. The lower panel, below the main saloon, was repainted in red and the cream coloured logo applied.(First week in May 2010).
Note 4: Motor coaches 101–105 delivered as BCFe 4/4 (2nd and 3rd class plus luggage, adhesion only), became ABFe 4/4 in 1956, ABDe 4/4 in 1963 and BDe 4/4 in 1970, when first class was abolished on CEV.
Note 5: Locomotives 1–3 were delivered as HGe 2/2 for rack & adhesion. 1950/51 they were rebuilt to rack only and became thus He 2/2.
Note 6: This railcar was the first to appear in Golden Pass white/gold livery in October 2011.
Note 7: These eight sets, 7501 - 8, are part of the re-equipment of the CEV, 2017 - 2019, to give a more frequent service from July 2019. No.7501 was released to traffic in December 2015 in the midnight blue and white livery similar to that formally used on the Golden Pass Panorama trains. The set is similar to the Stadler "Flirt" trains used elsewhere in Europe but this in metre gauge format.

Abbreviations 
 ABB  = ABB Group
 ACMV = Ateliers de constructions mécaniques de Vevey
 BBC  = Brown, Boveri & Cie
 CEV  = Chemins de fer électriques Veveysans
 MFO  = Maschinenfabrik Oerlikon
 MOB  = Montreux-Oberland Bernois
 R+J  = Ramseier + Jenzer
 SAAS = Société Anonyme des Ateliers de Sécheron, Geneva
 SIG  = Schweizerische Industrie Gesellschaft
 SLM  = Swiss Locomotive and Machine Works, Winterthur
 SWP  = Schindler Waggon Pratteln

Sources 
Michel Grandguillaume, Gérald Hadorn, Jean Paillard, Jean-Louis Rochaix: Crémaillères et funiculaires vaudois. BVA, Lausanne 1982, 
Michel Grandguillaume, Gérald Hadorn, Sébastien Jarne, Jean-Louis Rochaix: Voies étroites de Veveyse et de Gruyère. BVA, Lausanne 1984, 
Rochaix et al.: Chemins de fer privés vaudois 1873 - 2000. Editions La Raillère, CH-1092 Belmont 2000, 
Rochaix et al.: Chemins de fer privés vaudois 2000 - 2009. Editions La Raillère, CH-1092 Belmont 2009,

References 
www.blonaychamby.ch
(Histoire du chemin de fer Vevey-Blonay-Chamby de 1902 á 2002)

External links 

 Goldenpass

CEV
Transport in Vevey
Transport in the canton of Vaud